Timothée Guillimin (born 19 February 1996) is a French professional rugby union player. He plays as a fly half for the New England Free Jacks in Major League Rugby (MLR). 

Guillimin was educated College Capouchiné and Lycée Jean Moulin before attending UFR STAPS Montpellier and DUT GACO Agen.

He previously played for the Austin Elite (MLR) and SU Agen professionally.

In March 2021 he signed with New Orleans Gold. In January 2022 he became a business developer for RC Nîmes.

References

1996 births
Living people
Austin Gilgronis players
Expatriate rugby union players in the United States
French expatriate rugby union players
French expatriate sportspeople in the United States
New England Free Jacks players
People from Papeete
French rugby union players
Rugby union fly-halves
Rugby union centres
SU Agen Lot-et-Garonne players
New Orleans Gold players